This is a list of American films released in 2021.

The 2021 release schedule includes numerous notable films that were originally scheduled for release in 2020 but were postponed due to the COVID-19 pandemic.

Box office 
The highest-grossing American films released in 2021, by domestic box office gross revenue, are as follows:

January–March

April–June

July–September

October–December

References

External links 

 

2021
Lists of 2021 films by country or language